Utah is a state in the Mountain West sub-region of the Western United States. Since its admission to the Union in January 1896, it has participated in 32 United States presidential elections. In the 1896 presidential election, first presidential election in which the state participated, Utah was won in a landslide by Democrat William Jennings Bryan, who received almost 83 percent of the state's vote. However, the state would quickly swing towards the Republican Party in the years that followed, although it would remain a swing state at the presidential level well into the 1940s. In the 1912 election, Utah was one of only two states won by incumbent Republican President William Howard Taft. However, the state would vote for the Democratic nominee by a large margin in 1916, 1932, 1936, 1940, and 1944, and by a narrow margin in 1948. However, since the latter election, the state has become very heavily Republican and has only voted for a Democratic presidential nominee once (in 1964, amidst a national Democratic landslide).

In the 1992 presidential election, Utah was one of only two states in which independent Ross Perot finished second, placing ahead of Democrat Bill Clinton. In the 2016 presidential election, independent Evan McMullin ran ran as an independent and won almost 21.5% of the vote in the state, his strongest performance in the nation. , the Republican Party has won Utah in 17 of the last 18 presidential elections. Recent national surveys show Utah to be one of the most Republican states in the nation.

Presidential elections

Graph

See also
 Elections in Utah
 List of United States presidential election results by state

Notes

References

Works cited

 

United States presidential elections in Utah